The Era  is a river in Tuscany in Italy. It rises near Volterra and flows into the Arno river at Pontedera.

The Era is 54 km long, and its main tributaries are: (to the left) Cascina river, Ragone torrent, Sterza torrent, and (to the right) Capriggine torrent and Roglio torrent.

In 1966 the river flooded the town of Pontedera.

Rivers of Tuscany
Rivers of the Province of Pisa
Rivers of Italy